Stanimir Dimov Valkov (born 3 July 1978) is a Bulgarian defender, who currently plays for Tundzha Yambol.

Valkov previously played for FC Metallurg-Kuzbass Novokuznetsk in the Russian First Division.

Playing career

* – played games and goals

References

1978 births
Living people
Bulgarian footballers
Neftochimic Burgas players
Expatriate footballers in Latvia
First Professional Football League (Bulgaria) players
Association football defenders
FC Novokuznetsk players